Lord of the Jungle is a 1955 American adventure film in the Bomba, the Jungle Boy series. It was the last one in the 12-film series. Johnny Sheffield was 24 when he retired from the screen shortly after making this film.

Plot
Bomba must locate a rogue elephant before a stubborn group of government agents slaughter the entire herd. Surprisingly, Commissioner Barnes sides with the agents but his visiting niece helps Bomba. After surviving a stampede (while tied up), Bomba identifies the guilty elephant and rescues the herd.

Cast

References

External links

1955 films
American adventure films
Films directed by Ford Beebe
Allied Artists films
1950s English-language films
1950s American films
American black-and-white films